Popoudina kovtunovitchi is a moth in the family Erebidae. It was described by Vladimir Viktorovitch Dubatolov in 2011. It is found in Zimbabwe.

References

Moths described in 2011
Spilosomina